France competed at the 2004 Summer Paralympics in Athens, Greece. The team included 136 athletes, 106 men and 30 women. French competitors won 74 medals, 18 gold, 26 silver and 30 bronze to finish 9th in the medal table.

Medallists

Sports

Archery

Men

|-
|align=left|Charles Est
|align=left rowspan=2|Men's individual W2
|572
|22
|W 139-138
|L 149-157
|colspan=4|did not advance
|-
|align=left|Stephane Gilbert
|602
|11
|L 138-139
|colspan=5|did not advance
|-
|align=left|Olivier Hatem
|align=left|Men's individual W1
|628
|4
|colspan=2|Bye
|L 102-93
|colspan=4|did not advance
|-
|align=left|Eddy Gobbato
|align=left|Men's individual standing
|574
|17
|L 136-143
|colspan=5|did not advance
|-
|align=left|Olivier Hatem Eddy Gobbato Stephane Gilbert
|align=left|Men's team
|1804
|7
|N/A
| L 197-197 *
|colspan=4|did not advance
|}

In the men's round of 16 against Italy, a zero score was recorded due to the infringement of IPC rules in which the French team lost and Italy went onto the quarterfinals against the United States.

Athletics

Men's track

Men's field

Women's track

Women's field

Cycling

Men's road

Men's track

Equestrian

Football 5-a-side
The men's football 5-a-side team didn't win any medals: they were 5th out of 6 teams.

Players
Philippe Amaouche
Marc Bolivard
Bouchaib El Boukhari
Odile Gerfaut
Abderrahim Maya
Cedric Moreau
Sebastien Munos
Frederic Villeroux

Results

Judo

Men

KG - Kiken-gachi - win by withdrawal
FG - Fusen-gachi - win by default

Women

Powerlifting

Sailing

Shooting

Men

Swimming

Men

Women

Table tennis

Men

 - Kwong Kam Shing was disqualified after the excessive use of prohibited solvents on rackets; due to this, Christophe Durand was awarded the bronze medal.

Women

Men's teams

Women's teams

Wheelchair fencing

Men

Women

Teams

Wheelchair tennis

Men

Women

See also
France at the Paralympics
France at the 2004 Summer Olympics

References 

Nations at the 2004 Summer Paralympics
2004
Summer Paralympics